Red Ink (Spanish: Tinta Roja) is a 2000 Peruvian crime drama film released in 2000 based on the eponymous novel by Alberto Fuguet.  It was directed by Francisco J. Lombardi.

Plot summary
Two university students, Alfonso Fernandez Ferrer and his girlfriend Nadia, report to the editor of a tabloid newspaper to begin their stints as trainees.  Nadia is given first choice and chooses the entertainment section as her assignment.  Alfonso indicates that he too wanted the entertainment section but is advised that, since the newspaper's policy is to assign only one trainee to each section and Nadia has already chosen entertainment, Alfonso must work in a different section.  To Alfonso's consternation, he is assigned to serve as a trainee to Don Saul, the editor of the police crime section.

References

2000 films
2000 crime drama films
Peruvian crime drama films
2000s Peruvian films
Films directed by Francisco José Lombardi